Chris McGroarty (born 6 February 1981 in Bellshill) is a Scottish professional footballer who is currently player-manager of Scottish Junior Football Association, West Region side Kilsyth Rangers. He has previously played in the Scottish Premier League for Dunfermline Athletic.

Career
McGroarty began his career with Scottish Premier League side Dunfermline Athletic, making his first team debut in the 1998–99 season. His form earned a call up to the Scotland Under 21 side in 2001 but he was never capped. He was loaned out to Glasgow side Clyde in 2003 before moving to Paisley club St Mirren one month later. At the end of the 2003–04 season, McGroarty was released by St Mirren and was signed by Scottish Second Division side Dumbarton. After only 4 games with Dumbarton, McGroarty was signed by East Stirlingshire on a short-term contract.

At the end of McGroarty's contract with East Stirlingshire, he signed for Berwick Rangers and played 33 matches for them in the 2005–06 season, scoring five goals. He attracted attention from Stranraer and was signed at the start of the 2006–07 season, only to re-join Berwick in January of that season where he played five games. In May 2008, McGroaty was released from his contract with The Wee Gers He subsequently signed for Scottish Third Division side Stenhousemuir a few days later, by doing that he became the first player that manager John Coughlin has signed during his time at three clubs.

McGroarty in July 2009 signed a short-term contract for Second Division side Brechin City before joining Forfar Athletic in October the same year. He then signed for Junior side Glenrothes in 2010, before moving to Forth Wanderers in 2011.

Management
McGroarty was appointed as manager of Forth in May 2013. He joined Wishaw Juniors as manager in October 2014, then moved on to Kilsyth Rangers in August 2017.

References

External links
 
 

Living people
1981 births
Footballers from Bellshill
Scottish footballers
Scottish Premier League players
Scottish Football League players
Dunfermline Athletic F.C. players
Clyde F.C. players
St Mirren F.C. players
Dumbarton F.C. players
East Stirlingshire F.C. players
Berwick Rangers F.C. players
Stranraer F.C. players
Stenhousemuir F.C. players
Association football midfielders
Brechin City F.C. players
Forfar Athletic F.C. players
Scottish Junior Football Association players
Glenrothes F.C. players
Forth Wanderers F.C. players
Wishaw F.C. players
Scottish football managers
Scottish Junior Football Association managers